Denver Place is an office and retail complex in the central business district of Denver, Colorado. The property contains over 1 million square feet of space and occupies an entire city block. It was developed and completed in 1981 by Devco Property Inc. from design by Marvin E. Knedler & Assoc. The two towers are elongated hexagons made of silver gray aluminum panels contrasted by dark gray reflective glass. They sit diagonally from one another, connected by the Terraces to create a single structure which also has a bridge leading to the Ritz Carlton and Denver Place Apartments (also owned by Plant Holdings North America, Inc.). At the street level is a retail mall. The building has won many awards including the 2005 Denver Metro Building Owners And Managers Association Building of the Year Award in the Earth Award category and the Gold LEED-EB Label for its green design.

See also
List of tallest buildings in Denver

References

External links
Emporis

Skyscraper office buildings in Denver

Office buildings completed in 1981
Twin towers